, also known as , is a mountain located in the Daisetsuzan Volcanic Group of the Ishikari Mountains, Hokkaidō, Japan.

See also
List of volcanoes in Japan
List of mountains in Japan

References
 Geographical Survey Institute

Midori